Levente Schultz (born 22 March 1977) is a Hungarian footballer. He was born in Szeged.

References

1977 births
Living people
Sportspeople from Szeged
Hungarian-German people
Hungarian footballers
Association football midfielders
Ferencvárosi TC footballers
Békéscsaba 1912 Előre footballers
Lombard-Pápa TFC footballers
BFC Siófok players
Vasas SC players
Budapest Honvéd FC players
SV Wacker Burghausen players
Zalaegerszegi TE players
Pécsi MFC players
Hungarian expatriate footballers
Expatriate footballers in Austria
Expatriate footballers in Germany
Hungarian expatriate sportspeople in Austria
Hungarian expatriate sportspeople in Germany
3. Liga players